Domkino is the name of several rural localities in Russia:
Domkino, Leningrad Oblast, a village in Skreblovskoye Settlement Municipal Formation of Luzhsky District in Leningrad Oblast; 
Domkino, Pskov Oblast, a village in Strugo-Krasnensky District of Pskov Oblast